Saoud Ghanem (Arabic:سعود غانم; born 5 February 1981) in Kuwait is a Qatari international former footballer. He currently plays as a midfielder .

He is the brother of the Qatari player Mohamed Ghanem .

Career
He formerly played for Al-Sadd, Al-Wakrah, Umm Salal, Al-Sailiya and Qatar national football team .

References

External links
 
 

Living people
1981 births
Qatari footballers
Qatar international footballers
Qatari people of Kuwaiti descent
Naturalised citizens of Qatar
Kuwaiti emigrants to Qatar
Al Sadd SC players
Al-Wakrah SC players
Umm Salal SC players
Al-Sailiya SC players
Qatar Stars League players
Association football midfielders
Place of birth missing (living people)